Boyd Lake is a lake in western Quebec, Canada.

Lakes of Nord-du-Québec